The Diamond DA50 is a five seat, single-engine, composite aircraft designed and built by Diamond Aircraft Industries. First shown in 2006, it made its maiden flight on 4 April 2007. The project has been proposed to be powered by several different engines, but was certified on 9 September 2020 with the Continental CD-300 diesel.

Development
The DA50 Super Star prototype was unofficially first shown in December 2006 at a Diamond company Christmas party. The initial design goal was that it would have one of the largest cabins of the new generation of general aviation airplanes.

The avgas-powered version of the DA50 was intended to be equipped with a single FADEC-equipped Continental TSIO-550-J powerplant with twin turbo chargers producing . The maximum takeoff weight was planned to be . The Diamond DA50 Super Star was intended to be pressurized and to offer a Ballistic Recovery Systems aircraft parachute system as an option.

The DA50 made its first test flight on 4 April 2007 at the Wiener Neustadt East Airport, Austria. The airplane made its public debut at the AERO Friedrichshafen show in Germany on 19 April 2007 and was first shown in North America at Airventure in July 2007.

The DA50 project was put on hold in 2009 as the economy entered the Great Recession and Diamond turned all their attention to the Diamond D-Jet.

On 19 January 2015 the prototype, now designated DA50-JP7 and powered by an Ivchenko-Progress Motor Sich AI-450S turboprop powerplant, was test-flown in Wiener Neustadt. In 2015 type certification was expected near the end of 2016.

At the April 2017 AERO Friedrichshafen show, Diamond announced DA50 variants powered by diesel SMA Engines and other powerplants. These included the four-seat  DA50-IV, the five-seat  DA50-V and seven-seat  DA50-VII - also proposed to be powered by a  gasoline Lycoming engine or an Ivchenko-Progress Motor Sich AI-450S turboprop. The DA50-V model was displayed at that show. It had made its first flight in March 2017 and at that time certification was planned for 2018.

By April 2019 no DA50 models had been produced beyond one single prototype. The company then announced a new version of the design with fully retractable landing gear and a Continental CD-300 diesel engine, at the 2019 AERO Friedrichshafen show. That retractable gear-equipped second prototype was first flown on 28 October 2019. At that time Diamond planned to announce its price and start accepting orders at the Aero Friedrichshafen show in April 2020, with European certification and introduction expected in the third quarter of 2020.

Diamond Aircraft announced EASA certification of the DA50 RG (retractable gear) on 9 September 2020, with deliveries planned to start in the first quarter of 2021. American FAA certification is planned to be completed by the end of 2021.

Design 
The five-seat DA50 RG airframe is constructed predominantly of composite material.

The design features double-slotted flaps, retractable landing gear, a Garmin G1000 NXi flightdeck with autopilot and single lever power controls. Optional equipment includes a removable right-hand control stick, an on-board oxygen system, electric-powered air conditioning, a TKS de-icing system and a Garmin GCU 476 input keypad.

Operational history
In its first long flight, a factory demonstrator DA50 RG was flown from the factory in Austria to the China AirShow 2021 in Zhuhai, Guangdong. The flight involved 12 stops en route and took 45 flight hours over eight days, flying .

Pilots Matthias Niederhäuser and Robin Wenger completed a global circumnavigation in a DA50 during January 2022.

Variants
DA50 SuperStar
 Pressurized version powered by a Teledyne Continental TSIOF-550J. US FAA certification was initially forecast for 2012.
DA50 Magnum
 Unpressurized version, with a standard integral oxygen system, powered by an Austro Engine AE 300  diesel, US FAA certification originally forecast for mid-2010.
DA50-JP7
Seven-seat version powered by a  FADEC-controlled Ivchenko-Progress Motor Sich AI-450S turboprop engine. Two sub-variants were planned, one "tundra" version with rugged landing gear, and one high-performance version for training and private customers. Certification was initially planned for the mid to end of 2016.
DA50-IV
Four-seat version powered by a  SMA SR305-230 diesel engine announced at the AERO Friedrichshafen show in April 2017.
DA50-V
Five-seat version powered by an SMA Engines  diesel engine. It was first flown in March 2017 and introduced at the AERO Friedrichshafen show in April 2017. Certification was initially planned for 2018.
DA50-VII
Seven-seat version powered by an SMA Engines SMA SR460  diesel engine, a  Lycoming Engines gasoline powerplant or a  Ivchenko-Progress Motor Sich AI-450S turboprop. The model was announced at the Aero Friedrichshafen show in April 2017.
DA50 RG
Five seat version powered by a Continental CD-300  diesel engine. The model received an EASA type certificate on 9 September 2020.

Specifications (DA50 RG)

See also

References

External links

2000s Austrian civil utility aircraft
DA50
Single-engined tractor aircraft
Low-wing aircraft
T-tail aircraft
Aircraft first flown in 2007